German submarine U-923 was a Type VIIC U-boat of Nazi Germany's Kriegsmarine during World War II.

She was ordered on 6 June 1941, and was laid down on 21 February 1942 at Neptun Werft AG, Rostock, as yard number 510. She was launched on 7 August 1943 and commissioned under the command of Leutnant zur See Heinz Frömmer on 4 October 1943.

Design
German Type VIIC submarines were preceded by the shorter Type VIIB submarines. U-923 had a displacement of  when at the surface and  while submerged. She had two shafts and two  propellers.

U-923 was fitted with five  torpedo tubes (four fitted at the bow and one at the stern), fourteen torpedoes or 26 TMA mines, one  SK C/35 naval gun, (220 rounds), one  Flak M42 and two twin  C/30 anti-aircraft guns. The boat had a complement of between 44 — 52 men.

Service history
U-923 sunk 9 February 1945, in the Bay of Kiel in the Baltic Sea after striking a British air-laid mine. The crew of 48 were all lost.

References

Bibliography

External links

German Type VIIC submarines
U-boats commissioned in 1943
World War II submarines of Germany
Ships built in Rostock
1943 ships
Maritime incidents in February 1945